Li Peiyao (1 June 1933 – 2 February 1996) was a Chinese politician. He was born in Cangwu County, Guangxi, the son of Li Jishen, the founder of the Revolutionary Committee of the Chinese Kuomintang (RCCK), a breakaway faction of the Kuomintang that cooperated with the Communists. He served as Chairman of the RCCK from 1992 to his death in 1996 and a Vice-Chairman of the National People's Congress Standing Committee from 1993 to 1996.

In February 1996, Li was killed by Zhang Jinlong (张金龙), an 18-year-old security guard from the People's Armed Police (PAP). According to court documents, Li returned home and caught Zhang in the middle of a burglary attempt. After a physical struggle, Zhang repeatedly chopped Li with a cleaver from the home kitchen, and Li bled to death. Zhang then continued looting Li's apartment, carrying with him an expensive camera, a leather jacket, and other goods. He was discovered by a neighbour who reported the incident to the police. Zhang was arrested and sentenced to death. PAP commander Lt. Gen. Ba Zhongtan was fired as a result of the incident.

References 

1933 births
1996 deaths
Beihang University alumni
People's Republic of China politicians from Guangxi
Vice Chairpersons of the National People's Congress
Chinese murder victims
People murdered in China
People from Wuzhou
Deaths by stabbing in China